The Đurđevi Stupovi Monastery (lit. "Pillars of St. George") is a Serbian Orthodox monastery located in the vicinity of today's city of Novi Pazar, in the Raška region of Serbia.

The monastery is located near Novi Pazar, on the top of a prominent elevation covered with woods. It was erected in ca. 1170 as an endowment of Grand Prince Stefan Nemanja, dedicated to St. George; it is known as the "Pillars of St. George". The monastery is exceptional not only for its position and significance it had according to medieval chronicles and manuscripts, but also for its particular architecture. It was named after the church dedicated to St George and its two former bell towers, two high towers – pillars (old Slavic language- stolp, stub). Namely, according to Stefan the First-Crowned, Nemanja had built this church to commemorate his gratitude to St. George for saving him from dungeons-caves where he was put by his brothers.

Burials

Stefan Dragutin of Serbia

See also

Monument of Culture of Exceptional Importance
Tourism in Serbia

References

External links 

 Pillars of St. George- Virtual Tours and Photo Collections of the Blago Fund

Cultural Monuments of Exceptional Importance (Serbia)
Architecture in Serbia
Novi Pazar
Serbian Orthodox monasteries in Serbia
Christian monasteries established in the 12th century
12th-century Serbian Orthodox church buildings
Tourist attractions in Serbia
Landmarks in Serbia
12th-century establishments in Serbia
World Heritage Sites in Serbia